For information on all University at Buffalo sports, see Buffalo Bulls

The Buffalo Bulls women's basketball team is the women's basketball team that represents the University at Buffalo in Buffalo, New York. The team currently competes in the East Division of the Mid-American Conference. The Bulls reached their first NCAA tournament in 2016 and as of 2022 have appeared in four NCAA tournaments in total, including a Sweet Sixteen appearance in 2018.

List of seasons
Through the 1996–97 season, the women’s basketball teams were known as the Royals. The name was changed to the Bulls for the 1997–98 season.

Postseason appearances

NCAA Division I Tournament appearances

The Bulls have been to 4 NCAA Division I women's basketball tournaments. They achieved their highest seed in 2019 with a #10 seed. Their record is 3–4.

References

External links